The men's 20 kilometre individual biathlon competition at the 1988 Winter Olympics was held on 20 February, at Canmore Nordic Centre.  Each miss resulted in one minute being added to a competitor's skiing time.

Summary 
The defending world champion, Frank-Peter Roetsch, had the fastest ski time by more than a full minute, and despite three missed shots, he held off the field to win by 20 seconds. 1986 World champion Valeriy Medvedtsev and Norway's Eirik Kvalfoss finished with the joint second-fastest ski time, but while Medvedtsev's two misses saw him win silver, Kvalfoss missed three and finished 6th. Italy's Johann Passler, the fourth-fastest skier, held off Sergei Tchepikov, who had the best shooting score, to win bronze.

Results

References

Individual